Phrynobatrachus manengoubensis is a species of frog in the family Phrynobatrachidae. It is endemic to Cameroon and only known from its type locality in the Monengouba Mountains. However, it is quite likely be a synonym of Phrynobatrachus werneri. It probably breeds in Crater Lake and lives in the surrounding grasslands.

References

manengoubensis
Endemic fauna of Cameroon
Amphibians of Cameroon
Amphibians described in 1940
Taxonomy articles created by Polbot